The 2015 FIBA U16 European Championship Division B was the 12th edition of the Division B of the European basketball championship for men's national under-16 teams. It was played from 6 to 16 August 2015 in Sofia, Bulgaria. Estonia men's national under-16 basketball team won the tournament.

Participating teams

  (16th place, 2014 FIBA Europe Under-16 Championship Division A)

  (15th place, 2014 FIBA Europe Under-16 Championship Division A)

  (14th place, 2014 FIBA Europe Under-16 Championship Division A)

First round
In the first round, the teams were drawn into four groups of six. The first two teams from each group advance to the quarterfinal groups; the third and fourth teams advance to the 9th–16th place classification; the other teams will play in the 17th–24th place classification groups.

Group A

Group B

Group C

Group D

17th–24th place classification

Group I

Group J

21st–24th place playoffs

21st–24th place semifinals

23rd place match

21st place match

17th–20th place playoffs

17th–20th place semifinals

19th place match

17th place match

9th–16th place classification

Group G

Group H

13th–16th place playoffs

13th–16th place semifinals

15th place match

13th place match

9th–12th place playoffs

9th–12th place semifinals

11th place match

9th place match

1st–8th place classification

Group E

Group F

5th–8th place playoffs

5th–8th place semifinals

7th place match

5th place match

Championship playoffs

Semifinals

3rd place match

Final

Final standings

See also
2015 FIBA Europe Under-16 Championship (Division A)

References

FIBA U16 European Championship Division B
B
2015–16 in European basketball
2015–16 in Bulgarian basketball
International youth basketball competitions hosted by Bulgaria
Sports competitions in Sofia
August 2015 sports events in Europe
FIBA Europe Under-16 Championship Division B
FIBA U16